A Sleeping Life is a crime-novel by British writer Ruth Rendell, first published in 1978. It features her popular investigator Detective Inspector Wexford, and is the tenth novel in the series. It was shortlisted for the Mystery Writers' Of America Edgar Award, making it one of only two Inspector Wexford novels ever to have been shortlisted for either of the "big two" crime-fiction awards, the Edgar or the CWA Gold Dagger.  An Unkindness of Ravens was also nominated several years later.

1978 British novels
Novels by Ruth Rendell
Hutchinson (publisher) books
Inspector Wexford series